Bishop Cyril may refer to:
Cyril of Alexandria
Cyril Stuart, Bishop in Uganda from 1932 to 1952